The 1927 Calgary municipal election was held on December 14, 1927, to elect a Mayor and six Aldermen to sit on Calgary City Council. Along with positions on Calgary City Council, four trustees for the Public School Board and four questions were put before the voters.

Calgary City Council governed under "Initiative, Referendum and Recall" which is composed of a Mayor, Commissioner and twelve Aldermen all elected to staggered two year terms. Commissioner Arthur Garnet Graves and six Aldermen: Eneas Edward McCormick, Edith Patterson, Harold McGill, John Walker Russell, Reuben Weldon Ward, and Peter Turner Bone elected in 1926 continued in their positions.

Mayor Frederick Ernest Osborne was acclaimed on close of nominations on December 7, 1928.

Background
The election was held under the Single Transferable Voting/Proportional Representation (STV/PR) with the term for candidates being two years.

Former Calgary Mayor John William Mitchell contested the Aldermanic election as an Independent, however he fell just short of returning to council.

Results

Council
Quota for election was 1,343.

Public School Board

Separate school board

Plebiscites

Storm sewer
Construction of storm sewers at a cost of $127,000. Approval requires two-thirds majority.
For - 3,003
Against - 1,774

Centre St. vote
Widening of Centre Street at a cost of $20,000. Approval requires two-thirds majority.
For - 3,126
Against - 1,586

Clinic vote
Continuation of the present clinic system. Approval requires two-thirds majority.
For - 6,357
Against - 2,252

School vote
For the erection of two new high schools at a cost of $500,000. Approval requires majority.
For - 2,568
Against - 2,078

See also
List of Calgary municipal elections

References

Sources

1920s in Calgary
Municipal elections in Calgary
1927 elections in Canada